, literally meaning "bear", is the name of two characters within the Tekken fighting game series released by Namco Bandai Games. Kuma I was introduced in the first Tekken and returned for Tekken 2, while Kuma II was introduced in Tekken 3 and has returned for all subsequent games. Both of them are tame bears, bodyguards to Heihachi Mishima, as well as father and son towards each other. The female  was introduced in Tekken 3 as a palette swap of Kuma, returning for subsequent games.

Kuma

Tekken series
 Kuma I
The first Kuma was once an abandoned cub in the forests of the Mishima estate. Heihachi Mishima found Kuma and took him in as his pet. Despite Kuma's unflinching loyalty to his master, Kuma liked to leave the side of Heihachi to sleep, even during the summer. This lazy approach means that Kuma's fighting style has never really matured and is very disjointed. This was demonstrated in the previous King of Iron Fist Tournament, where Kuma was easily defeated by Paul Phoenix. Kuma was very impressed with Paul's fighting prowess, as he thought that the only strong human was Heihachi. Heihachi was defeated in the last tournament by Kazuya Mishima, and so the two retreated into a mountain dojo to re-train. Kuma traveled to the King of Iron Fist Tournament 2 with his master, vowing to destroy Paul Phoenix this time, If anyone gets in his way, he would eat them, However Kuma was easily defeated by Paul Phoenix again.

 Kuma II
Just after the second tournament Kuma died of old age, Heihachi trains a replacement, also named Kuma, Just like his father, the second Kuma is Heihachi Mishima's pet and bodyguard. Kuma is in love with Panda, but she neither feels the same nor has any interest in him. It is noted that although she does not love him, she does occasionally give him a thought, this Kuma is smarter than his father, and a good bodyguard for Heihachi. One day, when it was absorbed in watching TV, he suddenly went wild at the sight of a martial artist with a scarlet go-gi. It was Paul Phoenix, Kuma has trained since that day to defeat Paul in the King of Iron Fist Tournament 3. It doesn't think anything of Ogre, who is the God of Fighting; only of defeating Paul. However during the third tournament Kuma was easily defeated by Paul. Kuma would finally accomplish his goal of defeating Paul in the King of Iron Fist Tournament 4. However, Kuma's happiness was brought to an abrupt end with the death of his master Heihachi. Kuma lived in sorrow over Heihachi's presumed death, but on seeing the uncertainty surrounding the Mishima Zaibatsu, Kuma realized that saving it would be the ultimate display of loyaly to his presumed deceased master. The chaos at Mishima Zaibatsu had already subsided when Kuma arrived, and he was thrown out of the building by security. Kuma had no choice but to return to the mountains.

When the Mishima Zaibatsu announced the King of Iron Fist Tournament 5, Kuma decided he would enter the tournament and take back the Mishima Zaibatsu. During the fifth tournament Kuma would fight Paul Phoenix once again but just barely lost to him. Sometime after the King of Iron Fist Tournament 5, since the death of his master, Heihachi Mishima, Kuma was convinced that he was the only one who could save the Mishima Zaibatsu. He set out to the Mishima Zaibatsu head quarters with resolve.

Waiting for him there was the new leader of the Zaibatsu, Jin Kazama. Easily defeated by Jin, Kuma was dumped out of a helicopter into the Hokkaido wilderness. Despite that, Kuma survived with an alarming toughness. He traverses the vast forests and enters the King of Iron Fist Tournament 6, determined to defeat Jin and take his place as the rightful successor of the Mishima Zaibatsu.

Following Heihachi’s surprising return as a Mishima Zaibatsu leader since Jin’s disappearance, Kuma was found by his master’s Tekken Force army, and learned that his master promotes him to lead his own Tekken Force unit. Due to being busy with important tasks as a leader of his Tekken Force unit, Kuma forfeits from the King of Iron Fist Tournament 7 where his opponent is supposedly Paul again. Instead, Paul’s opponent is Kuma’s crush, Panda, unbeknownst to Kuma himself. Kuma’s last known location during the tournament is at Philippine, where he and his unit provides supplies for the survivors of typhoon disaster at Philippine to earn the local country’s trust, then becoming a final opponent for the Zaibatsu’s employment exam. Although many young participants either quits or being defeated by him during the exam, one of typhoon survivor who participate the exam, Josie Rizal is the only one left, despite Kuma felt bad about her crybaby attitude.

Other games
Kuma appears in Capcom-made crossover fighting game Street Fighter X Tekken with Heihachi Mishima as his official partner. His Swap Costume is modeled after R. Mika. According to the download blurb, Kuma has joined R. Mika's wrestling league. Apparently this was the only costume that could fit him. Kuma appears as a support character in PlayStation All-Stars Battle Royale. He is summoned by Heihachi Mishima's level 2 Super, where he runs around the stage slashing at fighters with his claws, pounds the ground and despawns. He also appears as a minion, and can be unlocked by reaching rank 8 with Heihachi. Kuma also appears in Hyperdimension Neptunia Victory and its remake as a NPC that appears on some of the events of the DLC character, Tekken. Kuma however never uses actual bear sounds in his appearance in Victory, but is rather voiced by Tekken director, Katsuhiro Harada. He was described as Tekken's sparring partner and close friend. Kuma appears as a Spirit in the Nintendo crossover video game Super Smash Bros. Ultimate.

In other media
Kuma I made a cameo in Tekken: The Motion Picture, climbing down a tree. Kuma appears in comics Tekken Saga (1997), Tekken 2 (1998) and Tekken Forever (2003). A picture of Kuma II is briefly seen in the CGI film Tekken: Blood Vengeance, when Anna Williams recruits Ling Xiaoyu at Mishima Polytechnic School.

Character design
In Tekken, Kuma I was represented as a sun bear; however in Tekken 2, Kuma is either a grizzly bear or a polar bear, depending on which outfit is used. Kuma II is always depicted as a large, grizzly bear with brown fur. He almost always wears a red scarf and red spiked wristband on the left hand. In Tekken 4, however, he wears red T-shirt with a design on the back and red-white paw rubber shoes. Later, he also gains red spiked anklet on the left leg instead of red wristband.

Kuma fights using an "original" fighting style called Kuma Shinken, a move set closely resembling Mishima family's style of karate. In the earlier games, Kuma Shinken took many elements from the Jack models' fighting style. However, in later games, the art started to gain some originality with unique strikes and even a "hunting" mode which puts Kuma on all fours for more attacks. This fighting style is considered one of the most unusual, as it does not rely on straight attacks, but instead uses tricks such as rolls, dodges, and various other stances. Because of this, Kuma is one of the hardest characters to master, as he is quite slow and not very flexible. Kuma also has move where he turns around, stands on all fours, relaxes, and then farts, which would instant kill the opponent.

Reception
GameSpy named Kuma as one of the "25 Extremely Rough Brawlers" in video gaming, commenting "This one is simple – Kuma is a bear. An actual bear. A wild animal." UGO Networks listed Kuma as one of "The 50 Cutest Video Game Characters", adding "It’s always adorable when bears try to do human things". 1UP.com listed Kuma as one of the characters they wanted to see in Street Fighter X Tekken, stating "you can't have Tekken in the title without some sort of animal that is ready for a throwdown". In a GamesRadar article, a fight between Kuma and Zangief was written as one of the ones players wanted to see in Street Fighter X Tekken, commenting "In what will certainly be the most anticipated and, bizarrely, logical of these match ups, The Red Cyclone will finally be able to prove himself against his eternal arch nemesis, a bear." FHM listed Kuma and Zangief as one of the "10 Awesome Fantasy Fights in Street Fighter X Tekken, adding "Dude’s strong enough to take on bears, but Kuma here is no ordinary bear." PlayStation Official Magazine ranked Kuma as the seventh best tag team finisher in Street Fighter X Tekken, suggesting to "team the hairy great brute up with Kuro for the ultimate little-and-large comedy double act." In 2012, Complex named Kuma's spinning backwards and his proposal to Panda as one of the "15 craziest moments in the Tekken series". Complex also ranked Kuma's denied proposal to Panda in the Tekken 3 ending as the "23rd funniest moment in video games, commenting "We cried laughing watching this ending. And we still cry. It's really that amazing." 4thletter placed Kuma's (alongside Heihachi's) Street Fighter X Tekken and Tekken 4 endings at 200th and 76th places, respectively in their list "Top 200 Fighting Game Endings".

Panda

Appearances
Panda is the pet of Ling Xiaoyu in the games since Tekken 3. Kuma is in love with Panda, but she is not interested in him romantically. Panda is cared for at Ling Xiaoyu's high school. To participate in the tournament, Ling moved to the Mishima Industrial College in Japan. Heihachi taught Panda advanced bear fighting so that she could act as a bodyguard for Xiaoyu throughout the series.

Panda also appears in Tekken Card Challenge, Tekken Tag Tournament, Tekken 3D: Prime Edition and Tekken Tag Tournament 2. She is briefly seen in Xiaoyu's Street Fighter X Tekken promotional art where she is seen on the roof of what appears to be Mishima Polytechnic. In the same game, Chun-Li's Swap Costume is based on Panda's appearance. Panda appears as a Spirit in the Nintendo crossover video game Super Smash Bros. Ultimate. Panda appears in the CGI film Tekken: Blood Vengeance, as a supporting character, voiced by Taketora, who also voices Akuma in Street Fighter.

Design
Panda is, as her name implies, always depicted as a giant panda with pink or orange glowing bands and a green holster wrapped around her shoulder. The holster has grass inside of it. Since her introduction, she has always been a palette swap of Kuma, and thus has the same move set as him. In Tekken Tag Tournament 2, she is separated from Kuma and is given her own slot, even though she still has the same move set as Kuma's. They have the same moves, stance, and animations (shown before and after a fight), but their endings are always, in some way, different. Their animations (shown before and after a fight) are however differentiated in Tekken Tag Tournament 2, then followed by Tekken 7 where their movesets are identical except for their Rage Arts.

References

Animal characters in video games
Panda
Fictional bears
Fictional bodyguards in video games
Fictional duos
Fictional karateka
Panda
Male characters in video games
Tekken characters
Video game characters introduced in 1994
Panda